Viola Ingrid Birss is a Professor of Chemistry at the University of Calgary. She works on electrochemistry and the development of nanomaterials for sustainable energy and sensing applications. She has demonstrated a metal oxide perovskite that can be used as the air and fuel electrode in solid oxide fuel cells, as well as creating nanoporous carbon scaffolds to be used in batteries and capacitors.

Early life and education 
Birss grew up in Crowsnest Pass, Alberta. She moved to Calgary at the age of five. When she was deciding what to study at college she felt that physics was "too abstract", and biology "too descriptive", so settled on chemistry. Having grown up with the wilderness close to her home, Birss was always aware of the environment, and interested in identifying clean ways of storing, converting and using energy. This attracted her to materials science and electrochemistry. Birss earned her doctorate at the University of Auckland as a Commonwealth Scholar, where she studied anodic films on silver electrodes. Her doctoral thesis was titled Electrochemical studies of anodic films on silver. She was a postdoctoral researcher at the University of Ottawa, where she worked on the supercapacitive properties of hydrous metal oxides. During this post she specialised in Ruthenium(IV) oxide.

Research and career 
Birss began her independent career at Alcan International, where she developed new techniques to evaluate the susceptibility of aluminium alloys to stress corrosion and pitting. Her efforts resulted in the creation of a high-strength corrosion-resistant alloy; Al-Mg-Si alloy. She moved to the University of Calgary in 1983 and was promoted to Full Professor in 1991.

Birss studies nanomaterials for a range of different applications, including fuel cells, batteries, capacitors and sensors. She is also interested in catalysis and drug sensing. In 2002 she was a founder of the Western Canada Fuel Cell Initiative, which included over 35 research groups at eight institutions. This was supported by $2 million of funding under Birss' leadership. She subsequently founded the pan-Canadian Solid Oxide Fuel Cells Canada, an umbrella organisation for groups working on solid oxide fuel cells.  Her work has focused on understanding and modifying the electrochemical, chemical, physical and morphological properties of thin films on electrode surfaces. This has involved the development of redox-active metal oxides.

Birss became a Tier 1 Canada Research Chair in Fuel Cells at the University of Calgary in 2004. The majority of her efforts have focussed on solid oxide fuel cells (SOFCs) and proton-exchange membrane fuel cells (PEMFCs), carbon materials and biological sensing. Her main contributions have been to the identification of the kinetics and mechanisms of oxidation and reduction in fuel cells using electrochemical methods, as well as developing new fuel cell materials. She has improved the performance and lifetime of low temperature PEMFCs through the development of carbon scaffolds. For high temperature SOFCs Birss has developed metal oxide perovskite catalysts that can be used as both the anode and cathode, allowing for carbon dioxide and water splitting.

She has worked with Honeywell on electrodeposition of metal coatings to enhance their protection. She has since served as Co-Director of the Natural Sciences and Engineering Research Council Strategic Research Network, which distributes $5.5 million funding across 16 research groups.

Awards and honours 
Her awards and honours include;

 1985 Electrochemical Society W. Lash Miller Award
1991 Chemical Institute of Canada C. Benson Award
1994 YWCA Award of Distinction in Science
1995 University of Calgary Award for Research Excellence
1998 CIC Lecture Award
2007 Fellow of the Electrochemical Society
2010 Finalist for Outstanding Leadership in Alberta
2017 Electrochemical Society David C. Grahame Award

She is a Fellow of the Royal Society of Canada, the Chemical Institute of Canada and the Electrochemical Society.

Selected publications 
Her publications include:

 
 
 

Birss serves as associate editor of the Journal of Materials Chemistry A.

References 

Canadian women chemists
Canadian women academics
Academic staff of the University of Calgary
Academic staff of the University of Ottawa
University of Auckland alumni
Canadian materials scientists
Women materials scientists and engineers
Living people
Year of birth missing (living people)
21st-century Canadian women scientists
21st-century Canadian chemists